Dermomurex sepositus is a species of sea snail, a marine gastropod mollusk in the family Muricidae, the murex snails or rock snails.

Description
The length of the shell attains 9 mm.

Distribution
This species occurs in the Atlantic Ocean off Cameroon.

References

 Merle D., Garrigues B. & Pointier J.-P. (2011) Fossil and Recent Muricidae of the world. Part Muricinae. Hackenheim: Conchbooks. 648 pp. page(s): 223

External links
 MNHN, Paris: holotype

Endemic fauna of Cameroon
Gastropods described in 1993
Dermomurex